Lieutenant General Morris Moadira  is a retired South African Army officer who served as the Chief of Logistics for the South African National Defence Force.

He joined Umkhonto we Sizwe in 1978 before starting training in Angola.

In 2004 he commanded the Army Support Base in Bloemfontein, in the rank of brigadier general before being promoted to major general in 2011 and appointed Deputy Chief of Logistics

Awards and decorations

References

 

 

Living people
South African Army generals
Year of birth missing (living people)